Margit Symo (13 September 1913 – 6 October 1992) was a Hungarian-born German actress.

Selected filmography
 Gypsy Blood (1934)
 A Night on the Danube (1935)
 Autobus S (1937)
 The Yellow Flag (1937)
 Not a Word About Love (1937)
 The Irresistible Man (1937)
 Carmen, la de Triana (1938)
 Nights in Andalusia (1938)
 Tiszavirág (1939)
 Der Postmeister (1940)
 The Thing About Styx (1942)
 Altes Herz wird wieder jung (1943)
 The Little Town Will Go to Sleep (1954)
 I Often Think of Piroschka (1955)
 The Mad Bomberg (1957)
 Fear Eats the Soul (1974)

Bibliography

References

External links

1913 births
1992 deaths
German film actresses
Actresses from Budapest
20th-century German actresses
Hungarian emigrants to Germany